Peyser is a surname. It may refer to:

Gregory Peyser, American professional lacrosse player
Michael Peyser, American professional lacrosse player
Penny Peyser, American actress
Peter A. Peyser, United States Representative from New York
Stephen Peyser, American professional lacrosse player
Theodore A. Peyser, former Democratic member of the United States House of Representatives from New York

Other uses
Peyser Building—Security Savings and Commercial Bank, National Register of Historic Places in Washington, D.C.